Nancy Zimmerman (born 1963/64) is an American hedge fund manager. She is the co-founder of Bracebridge Capital, a Boston-based hedge fund with over $12 billion of assets under management as of June 2019. The fund manages investments for foundations, pensions, high net worth individuals and endowments, including those of Yale University and Princeton University. She gained media attention in 1997 for her involvement in the Harvard Institute for International Development's Russian aide controversy and in the 2010s for her firm’s role in Argentina’s debt restructuring. As of 2019, she is the wealthiest female hedge fund founder in the U.S.

Early life
Nancy Zimmerman was born and raised in Skokie, Illinois, the youngest of two girls. She graduated from Brown University in 1985.

Career
While attending Brown University, Zimmerman spent her summers working for O’Connor & Associates at the Chicago Mercantile Exchange. After graduation she spent three years with the firm, trading currency options. She later managed the interest rate option group for Goldman Sachs. At Goldman, her boss was Jon Corzine, who later became the Governor of New Jersey.

Bracebridge Capital 
Zimmerman co-founded Bracebridge Capital with Gabriel Sunshine in 1994 with $50 million in seed investment from Farallon Capital and Yale’s investment office. The fund also manages investments for Princeton University. As of June 2019, it had over $12 billion of assets under management.

In 2016, Bracebridge and a group of hedge funds successfully contested the debt obligations of Argentina in a New York court of law. Under the deal negotiated, the hedge funds received about 75% of their judgements with Bracebridge receiving 92% gains, or $1.1 billion on an investment of $120 million.

Russian investments and settlement 
Zimmerman's investments in Russia made national headlines in 1997 when USAID ended a $14 million grant to the Harvard Institute for International Development, headed by Zimmerman's husband, after he was accused of using the institute to help Zimmerman with her investments. As part of a settlement, Zimmerman subsequently paid $1.5 million to the US government through one of her companies, Farallon Fixed Income Associates. Neither Zimmerman nor her husband admitted wrongdoing.

Personal life
Zimmerman is married to Andrei Shleifer, a professor of economics at Harvard University. She is Jewish. As of June 2019, she was worth an estimated $740 million and ranked #32 on Forbes 2019 America’s Self-Made Women List.

Zimmerman serves on the board of trustees of her alma mater, Brown University, a position she previously held from 2010 to 2016. She also serves as the Chair of the Carney Institute for Brain Science Advisory Council and is a member of the board of directors of Social Finance. Previously she served on the scholar selection committee of the Institute of International Education’s Scholar Rescue Fund.

References

1960s births
Living people
People from Skokie, Illinois
Brown University alumni
Businesspeople from Boston
Goldman Sachs people
American hedge fund managers
American women company founders
American company founders
20th-century American Jews
Harvard University people
21st-century American Jews
20th-century American women
21st-century American women